Barbara O'Connor may refer to:

 Barbara O'Connor (media studies scholar), Senior Lecturer in the School of Communications at Dublin City University
 Barbara O'Connor (author), author of children's books